Buddhist temples in Hanoi include:

External links

Chùa Hà Nội trên quangduc.com
Chùa Hà Nội trên www.hanoi.gov.vn
Chùa Hà Nội www.thuvienhoasen.org

 
Hanoi
Lists of religious buildings and structures in Vietnam